Westphalian Open-Air Museum may refer to:
 Detmold Open-air Museum
 Hagen Open-air Museum